Lynne J. Boomgaarden (born 1961) is an American judge who serves as an associate justice of the Wyoming Supreme Court.

Education 

Boomgaarden received her Bachelor of Science from the University of Wyoming in 1983 and her Juris Doctor with honor from the University of Wyoming College of Law in 1991.

Legal and academic career 

After graduating law school she served as a clerk for Judge Wade Brorby of the United States Court of Appeals for the Tenth Circuit. She served in private practice with Crowley Fleck, PLLP, as director of the Office of State Lands and Investments, and as an assistant professor at the University of Wyoming College of Law.

Service on Wyoming Supreme Court 

In December 2017 Governor Matt Mead appointed Boomgaarden to the Wyoming Supreme Court. Boomgaarden replaced Justice William U. Hill who retired on February 17, 2018. She was sworn into office on March 12, 2018. Boomgaarden is the third woman appointed the Wyoming Supreme Court.

References

External links 

Official Supreme Court biography

Living people
20th-century American lawyers
21st-century American lawyers
21st-century American judges
Wyoming lawyers
Justices of the Wyoming Supreme Court
20th-century American women lawyers
21st-century American women lawyers
21st-century American women judges
1961 births